Trusted Network Connect (TNC) is an open architecture for Network Access Control, promulgated by the Trusted Network Connect Work Group (TNC-WG) of the Trusted Computing Group (TCG).

History
The TNC architecture was first introduced at the RSA Conference in 2005. TNC was originally a network access control standard with a goal of multi-vendor endpoint policy enforcement.

In 2009 TCG announced expanded specifications which extended the specifications to systems outside of the enterprise network. Additional uses for TNC which have been reported include Industrial Control System (ICS), SCADA security, and physical security.

Specifications
Specifications introduced by the TNC Work Group:
 TNC Architecture for Interoperability 
 IF-IMC - Integrity Measurement Collector Interface  
 IF-IMV - Integrity Measurement Verifier Interface
 IF-TNCCS - Trusted Network Connect Client-Server Interface
 IF-M - Vendor-Specific IMC/IMV Messages Interface 
 IF-T - Network Authorization Transport Interface
 IF-PEP - Policy Enforcement Point Interface
 IF-MAP - Metadata Access Point Interface 
 CESP - Clientless Endpoint Support Profile
 Federated TNC

TNC Vendor Adoption
A partial list of vendors who have adopted TNC Standards:

 ArcSight
 Aruba Networks
 Avenda Systems
 Enterasys
 Extreme Networks 
 Fujitsu
 IBM
 Pulse Secure

 Juniper Networks
 Lumeta
 McAfee
 Microsoft
 Nortel
 ProCurve
 strongSwan
 Wave Systems

Also, networking by 
 Cisco
 HP
 Symantec
 Trapeze Networks
 Tofino

TNC Customer Adoption
The U.S. Army has planned to use this technology to enhance the security of its computer networks.

The South Carolina Department of Probation, Parole, and Pardon Services has tested a TNC-SCAP integration combination in a pilot program.

See also
IF-MAP
Trusted Computing
Trusted Computing Group
Trusted Internet Connection

References

Sources
Dornan, Andy. “'Trusted Network Connect' Puts Hardware Security Agent In Every PC”, “Information Week Magazine”, UBM Techweb Publishing.
Vijayan, Jaikumar. “Vendor Group Adds Net Access Specs”,  “Computer World Magazine”, IDG Publishing.
Higgins, Kelly Jackson. “Trusted Computing Group Widens Security Specs Beyond Enterprise Networks”, “Dark Reading”, UBM Techweb Publishing.
Townsend, Mark. “Naked endpoints on your net, and what to do about them”, “SC Magazine”, Haymarket Media.
Fang, Juan and Zeng, Hongli. “The Model of Trusted Network Connect Based on Credibility of the Hierarchy”, nswctc, vol. 2, pp. 454–457, 2010 Second International Conference on Networks Security, Wireless Communications and Trusted Computing, 2010.
Howard, Scott (2010-06)(“Securing SCADA and Control Networks”,  “urunkoruma.com”.

External links
 Trusted Network Connect 
 Specifications
 TNC SDK

Computer network security
Trusted computing